Raj Kumar Singh Gautam (born 18 August 1966) is an Indian politician and businessman. He is the founder and CMD (Chairman and Managing Director) of Gautam Group. He served as MLA (2007-2012) from Zamania constituency of Ghazipur, Uttar Pradesh.

Early life 
Raj Kumar Singh Gautam was born in Mainpur village, Karanda tehsil Ghazipur, Uttar Pradesh, India in 1966 in Hindu Rajput family to Shri Ranvijay Singh and Shrimati Radhika Devi. He belongs to Kshatriya caste which is dominant in Zamania Karanda belt. He studied at Udai Pratap College in Varanasi, Uttar Pradesh and finally completed his PhD in horticulture from Purvanchal University in 1993. He started his business in Varanasi in 1994.

References

1966 births
Bahujan Samaj Party politicians from Uttar Pradesh
Businesspeople from Uttar Pradesh
Living people
People from Ghazipur 
Politicians from Varanasi
Uttar Pradesh MLAs 2007–2012